Poplar River may refer to:

Canada
Manitoba
Poplar River (Manitoba)
Poplar River First Nation, a First Nation community astride the river in Manitoba
Ontario
Kenora District
Poplar River (Atikameg River), part of the Kapiskau River system
Poplar River (Fawn River), in the Severn River system
Poplar River (Manitoba) (the upper reaches of which are in Ontario)
Poplar River (Nipissing District), in Nipissing District, part of the French River system
Poplar River (Montana–Saskatchewan), a tributary of the Missouri River in Saskatchewan in Canada and Montana in the United States
United States
Poplar River (Lake Superior), Minnesota
Poplar River (Lost River), Minnesota
Poplar River (Montana–Saskatchewan), a tributary of the Missouri River in Saskatchewan in Canada and Montana in the United States